Ivan Anatolyevich Berezutsky (born December 6, 1985 in Armavir, Russia) is a Russian chef and restaurateur, a chef at the Twins Garden restaurant in Moscow, a holder of two Michelin stars. In 2019, Twins Garden took 19th place in the international rating of The World's 50 Best Restaurants, having risen by 53 points in comparison with the previous year and was named to be the best restaurant in Moscow (2018-2021) and the best restaurant in Russia (2020, 2022) in the nomination of the national restaurant awards WHERETOEAT Russia. Twin brother of chef and restaurateur Sergei Berezutsky.

References

External links
 
 

1985   births
Russian chefs
Russian restaurateurs
Head chefs of Michelin starred restaurants
Living people
People from Armavir, Russia
Russian twins